In theatre, les trois coups (the three blows) are hit on the floor of the stage with a stick called brigadier, just before the start of a performance, in order to attract public attention for the rise of the curtain.

This tradition, especially in France, may come from the Middle Ages, where three blows, symbolizing the Trinity, ended the mystery. These three blows could be preceded by eleven hammered ones (the twelve Apostles minus Judas). They may also be a tribute to the nine muses of ancient Greece. Hence, there would be nine rapid blows plus the "trois coups", thus twelve blows. Twelve, being a perfect number in its symbolism, symbolized the unity of theatre.

Another explanation matches the three blows with the three bows that comedians performed before playing in front of the Court, for the arrival of the King, the Queen and the Dauphin.

In French classical theatre, the dramaturge pounded the ground with twelve quick blows to announce to the machinists the start of the performance. Then a first blow came in response from the fly system operators; a second response rose from below the stage and a third one came from the opposite wing. Each machinist being in their position for the performance, the dramaturge could open the curtain.

The military rank of brigadier was given to a worker leading a team. The dramaturge, using a stick to hit the three blows, gathered the theatre staff to begin the show, like a brigadier gathering his men. Through metonymy, the stick itself was called a "brigadier".

The theatre brigadier is traditionally made of wood with a piece of theatre pole, decorated with red velvet and gold studded nails.

For years the Comédie-Française would hit six blows in order to commemorate the uniting of the two troupes, that of the Hôtel de Bourgogne and Molière's company, previously associated with that of the Théâtre du Marais under Louis XIV, allowing for daily performances.

References

External links 
  Gisèle Casadessus hitting the three blows (video)
  History 
  Origin of the "brigadier"
  Le rite des trois coups (karambolage) from ARTE
  Picture of a "brigadier" Théâtre de la Huchette

See also 
 Prix du Brigadier

Stage terminology